Farrell Randal "Randy" Sklar and Jason Nathan Sklar (born January 12, 1972), professionally known as the Sklar Brothers, are American identical twin brother comedians and actors best known for hosting the show Cheap Seats, which aired for four seasons on ESPN Classic.

Life and career
Randy and Jason grew up in suburban St. Louis, to a Jewish family. They went to the University of Michigan, where they joined the Alpha Epsilon Pi fraternity. While enrolled, they decided to pursue a career in comedy.

In 1994, they moved to New York where they developed their comedy style at stand-up comedy clubs.  In the summer of 1997, Jason and Randy starred in and wrote for MTV's sitcom/sketch/standup program Apt 2F.  It was their first television work.  The show lasted one season.

The Sklar brothers have also appeared in television shows such as CSI, Comedy Bang! Bang!, Mighty Med, Childrens Hospital, Law & Order, Becker, Providence, The Oblongs (as conjoined twin brothers Biff and Chip Oblong), Entourage, Grey's Anatomy (as conjoined twin brothers Peter and Jake Weitzman), Curb Your Enthusiasm (Jason only), and It's Always Sunny in Philadelphia (as dance marathon DJs on the episode "The Gang Dances Their Asses Off"). They recently appeared on season 3 of Better Call Saul as the owners of a music shop called ABQ In Tune. The Sklars have appeared in the films My Baby's Daddy, Bubble Boy, Wild Hogs, and The Comebacks.

The brothers were pit reporters on Comedy Central's Battlebots. Randy appeared on an episode of Take Home Chef, where his wife and chef Curtis Stone surprised him with a gourmet dinner of Beef Wellington. They have appeared numerous times on Chelsea Lately. They have appeared on Comedy Central's @midnight. They produced and starred in a special that ran on ESPN 2 called Utilityman: The Quest for Cooperstown a lighthearted yet somewhat serious attempt to get seminal utility baseball player for the St. Louis Cardinals in the 1980s José Oquendo into the Baseball Hall of Fame in Cooperstown. Randy has appeared numerous times on the Forum on Jim Rome is Burning on ESPN and Rome on CBS Sports. They appear monthly on Rome on Showtime in a segment called Sklarred for Life.

They appeared in the 2008 Microsoft film VoIP As You Are: The Legend of Dan Wilson.

They regularly fill in as guest hosts for Jim Rome on his National and North American syndicated radio show formerly on Premiere Radio, currently on CBS Radio.

They participated regularly on NPR's southern California affiliate KPCC's The Madeleine Brand Show as sports correspondents.

They produced two Sports Pilots called Sklar Talk for NPR's KPCC that both aired in 2011.

The Sklars are also frequent guests on the podcasts Never Not Funny and World Football Daily. They have also appeared on AST Radio, Jordan, Jesse GO! and Battleship Pretension, WTF with Marc Maron, You Made It Weird, and Professor Blastoff.

They were featured in the Troma production Citizen Toxie: The Toxic Avenger IV as Jason Gonzales and Jason Diaz, a pair of Tromaville Anchormen.

Randy and Jason are featured in an ad campaign by running shoe and apparel company Brooks.

In August 2010, they made a cameo appearance in the web comedy The Legend of Neil in season 3 episode 3, depicting two football-loving 'Armos' statues.

In 2012, the twins began to appear in what would become a series of commercials for Time Warner Cable.

In February 2014, the brothers recorded their first one-hour stand-up special at the Majestic Theater in Madison, Wisconsin. The special then premiered on Netflix on April 25, 2014 and the CD/DVD dropped on iTunes on Tuesday April 29, 2014. The brothers uniquely framed their special as if it were an NFL playoff game with Rich Eisen leading a roundtable discussion of the brothers' comedy on an NFL Network set, along with future Hall of Fame Defensive Lineman Dwight Freeney, NY Giant Defensive Back Terrell Thomas, and actor and former Georgia Bulldog football player Omar Dorsey. In addition the ubiquitous sideline reporter Bonnie Bernstein makes a cameo, interviewing the brothers pre- and post-show. The stand up special features a pre-game breakdown by this crew, a halftime report, and a post game wrap up. The stand up special titled What Are We Talking About will be available on Netflix instant streaming for three years after the April 25, 2014 premiere.

Randy Sklar is married to Amy Sklar, an interior designer who was featured on HGTVs Design Star and they have two daughters.

Jason is married to Dr. Jessica Zucker, a fertility therapist who created her own line of critically acclaimed pregnancy loss cards. They have a son and a daughter.

While on a special Mother's Day themed episode of @midnight with their mother, Annette, she was asked to pick her favorite son; she picked Randy without any hesitation.

Cheap Seats

Starting in 2004, Randy and Jason appeared on Cheap Seats, on which they played fictitious ESPN research assistants who end up hosting a comedy show as they comment on odd and notable sporting events from ESPN's extensive library.

Cheap Seats borrowed its format from Mystery Science Theater 3000. The cast of MST3K apparently were pleased with the show and afforded it a high honor - they appeared in the second season opener in their normal silhouette format, making fun of the Sklars' host show bits. So far it is the only time Michael J. Nelson, Bill Corbett and Kevin Murphy have appeared as their MST3K characters Mike Nelson, Crow T. Robot and Tom Servo, respectively, since MST3K was cancelled.

Web series
The brothers co-wrote with Nick Kroll the web series Layers, directed by Michael Blieden, on which they played twin publicists Larry and Terry Bridge. Their web series Back on Topps was produced by Vuguru, the online production company of Michael Eisner. It won two Streamy Awards.

In 2010, the online network Crackle released Held Up, an original series written by the brothers and starring Kaitlin Olson of It's Always Sunny in Philadelphia. Held Up tells the story of a bored bank teller’s life-changing experience when two teams of bumbling bank robbers hold up his branch.  They also started hosting a weekly Earwolf podcast series called Sklarbro Country in 2010.

SportsCenter
The brothers wrote and appeared on ESPN's SportsCenter in a comedic segment called "The Bracket". Randy and Jason occasionally fill in for Jim Rome on The Jim Rome Show on radio. Randy occasionally appeared as a "Forum" guest on ESPN's Jim Rome Is Burning. Currently, the duo make appearances on the Showtime show Rome also hosted by Jim Rome.

United Stats of America
In 2012, the Sklar brothers hosted a television show on History titled United Stats of America. A "by the numbers" series, it featured interesting statistics about the U.S., mixed with experiments, stunts, and the Sklars' unique brand of humor. After one season, the show is currently on indefinite hiatus. United Stats of America episodes are now available for viewing on Apple TV.

Sklarbro Country
From August 2010 to 2017 the Sklar Brothers hosted a popular weekly podcast called Sklarbro Country on the Earwolf network. They described the podcast as the intersection of sports, comedy, and indie rock, and the show had guests ranging from Jon Hamm to Terrell Owens to Diablo Cody. Memorable episodes featured Richard Simmons, Patton Oswalt, the end of the year Character Specials, Hamm, Rich Eisen, and Adam Carolla. Sklarbro Country was nominated for best podcast in the televised 2012 Comedy Central Comedy Awards.

In the summer of 2012, the Sklar Brothers added Sklarbro County to their weekly output of the podcast. Described as a shorter midweek snack of an episode, the show is co-hosted by up and coming character comedic actor Dan Van Kirk. Dan finds crazy stories of people doing stupid or silly things and Randy, Jason, and Dan and a guest all riff as if it were a writers' room. Randy has described the show this way: "If a 30-person brawl breaks out at a Chuck E. Cheese in Tampa, FL at a 5-year-old's birthday party and the fight spills over into a Burlington Coat Factory parking lot, ending in someone defecating in an ex-boyfriend's hatchback… we'll be there to make fun of it." Sklarbro County was available weekly on Tuesdays, also on the Earwolf Network.

Rome on Showtime
The brothers have become a regular staple of Jim Rome's monthly show, Rome on Showtime with a popular segment, titled "Sklarred for Life", where Jim Rome tees up the 6-8 craziest stories of the last month that happened in the world of sports, video clips, photos, arrests, and the brothers mercilessly skewer the subjects of those stories in a fast paced joke-ladened segment.

Better Call Saul
The Sklar brothers made a cameo appearance on AMC's Better Call Saul as the owners of a music shop who are purchasing airtime from the suspended lawyer Jimmy McGill.

This American Life
The brothers were featured on an episode of This American Life titled, "Sklar-Crossed Brothers," in which they investigated a family rumor and lifelong suspicion that their mother had misidentified them at some point in their infancy and their identities were from that point mistakenly switched. After getting an expert comparison of their baby footprints with their adult feet, it was determined that there was no mix up.

America's Got Talent
The Sklar Brothers later auditioned in season sixteen of America's Got Talent where their comedy act enabled them to advance to the next round. For unknown reasons, they were not invited to appear in the quarter-finals.

Stand-up specials

The brothers have done three stand up specials in their career. The first two stand-up specials were Comedy Central Presents half-hour stand-up specials that aired on Comedy Central in 2001 and in 2009. In April 2014, the brothers premiered What Are We Talking About, their first 1-hour stand up special on Netflix. The material was a culmination of material from the past couple of years, the 2011 album Hendersons and Daughters, and material written as close to 2 weeks before the special was recorded in Madison, Wisconsin at the Majestic Theater.

Dumb People Town Podcast
Since 2017 Randy and Jason have hosted a twice weekly podcast with Daniel Van Kirk called Dumb People Town. They usually have another comedian as a guest to discuss their career and life, and then they go over a few news stories, usually sent in by listeners via social media. These news stories are outrageous in nature, with people often hurting themselves or engaging in other "dumb" behavior.

Discography
Poppin' the Hood! (2004)
Sklar Maps (2007)
Hendersons and Daughters (2011)
What Are We Talking About (2014)
Hipster Ghosts (2018)

Filmography

Film

Television

References

External links
Sklar Brothers at whosay.com

Official Sklarbro Country site
Interview with the Sklars from 2007 on public radio program The Sound of Young America

1972 births
Living people
American male comedians
Jewish American male actors
Jewish male comedians
American male film actors
American male television actors
Identical twin male actors
Male actors from St. Louis
University of Michigan alumni
American podcasters
American twins
Comedians from Missouri
American comedy duos
American stand-up comedians
21st-century American comedians
Stand Up! Records artists
America's Got Talent contestants
21st-century American Jews
20th-century American Jews
20th-century American comedians